The 2013 Patriot League men's football season will be the 21st season of men's varsity soccer in the conference.

The American Eagles are the defending regular season champions, while the Lafayette Leopards are the defending tournament champions.

Changes from 2012 

 Boston University Terriers and the Loyola Greyhounds will be joining the conference

Season outlook

Teams

Stadia and locations

Standings

Results

Statistics

References 

 
2013 NCAA Division I men's soccer season